T-Works is India's largest prototyping centre. T-Works is an initiative of the Government of Telangana that is aimed to create and celebrate a culture of hobbyists, makers, and innovators in India; who explore and experiment without the fear of failure. T-Works Phase-1 is 78,000 sqft building, situated near T-Hub in Raidurg, Hyderabad, Telanagana. T-Works has over 200 industry grade tools worth  11.5 crore. T-Works Phase-2 will be further expanded to 2.5 lakh sqft over a 4.89-acre campus. To encourage innovators from smaller towns and rural areas, satellite centres of T-Works will also be set up in towns such as Warangal, Karimnagar, Khammam, Siddipet, Nizamabad, where IT towers are being set up by the Government of Telangana.

History
On 2 March 2023, Foxconn chairman Young Liu and Telangana industries & IT minister K. T. Rama Rao inaugurated T-Works via an innovative Kabuki drop (dramatic Japanese reveal style). Foxconn chairman also announced donation of a complete surface mount technology assembly line, which is used for assembling high-end electronics circuit boards, to T-Works.

See also
List of business incubators
National Institute of Design
 IMAGE Tower
 Salarpuria Sattva Knowledge City

References 

Economy of Telangana
Economy of Hyderabad, India
Organisations based in Hyderabad, India
Business incubators of India
KCR Government initiatives